The first season of American Idol premiered on June 11, 2002 (under the full title American Idol: The Search for a Superstar) and continued until September 4, 2002. It was won by Kelly Clarkson. The first season was co-hosted by Ryan Seacrest and Brian Dunkleman, the latter of whom left the show after the season ended.

The winner, Kelly Clarkson, signed with RCA Records, the label in partnership with American Idol's 19 Recordings. Immediately post-finale, Clarkson released two singles, including the coronation song, "A Moment Like This". "A Moment Like This" went on to break a thirty-eight-year-old record held by The Beatles for a song's biggest leap to number one on the Billboard Hot 100. It jumped up from number fifty-two to number one in just one week. She held that record for five years but she reclaimed that record back in 2009 with her hit single "My Life Would Suck Without You" when it jumped up from number ninety-seven to number one. Clarkson has enjoyed a successful recording and talk show hosting career since winning, with multiple-platinum albums, numerous Top 10 hit singles, three Grammy Awards and five Emmy Awards. Runner-up Justin Guarini also signed with RCA Records, eventually debuting an album in 2003 after the conclusion of season 2. RCA dropped him shortly after its debut.  In addition to Clarkson and Guarini, also signed were Nikki McKibbin, Tamyra Gray, R. J. Helton, and Christina Christian.

After the finale, a special show in Las Vegas was also shown on September 23, 2002, where all 30 of the contestants who made the judges' initial cut performed in a two-hour concert.

Regional auditions

Auditions were held in New York City, Los Angeles, Chicago, Dallas, Miami, Atlanta, and Seattle in the spring of 2002, and around 10,000 attended the auditions.

  
One of the more prominent auditioners was Tamika Bush who objected to the judges' critiques and their pronunciation of her name.  She was later invited back to critique the contestants' semifinal performance.  Kristin Holt, who auditioned in Dallas, was put through to the Hollywood rounds, but in her rush to embrace the judges, fell and slipped under the judges' table.

Kelly Clarkson was notable for being largely absent in the audition episode, and she remains the only winner whose audition was not aired in the original broadcast.  The other top 10 finalists in Season 1 whose auditions were not shown were Nikki McKibbin and EJ Day.

Structure of auditions
There are usually three stages in the audition process in every season, the first stage being the open call audition advertised.  In this stage those auditioning each sings briefly in groups of five in front of selectors, though some may be asked to sing further.  Most of those who attended are eliminated at this stage with only a limited number of auditioners selected to proceed further. In the second round they sing in front the executive producers and more are eliminated. In some later years a further round may be added before this round of audition.  In the last round those who survive the first two-stage sing in front of the judges and this is the audition shown on television.  Those who gain at least two "yes" votes from the three judges then receive a golden ticket to Hollywood.

In the first season, the second and third stage of the audition may take place within a single day, but in the following seasons each stage of the audition may take place on separate days.  The initial audition venue need not necessarily be the final audition venue in front of the judges, and in later seasons, up to three separate venues may be used for the auditions in each city.  The venues and dates of the second audition in front of the producers are not specifically listed in these pages.   In the early seasons, the entire audition process in each city took place within a relatively short span of time, three days in the case of Season 1, but became progressively extended in later seasons until the callback date may be many weeks after the initial auditions.

Hollywood week
The Hollywood week rounds were held in Pasadena Civic Center where 121 contestants competed for a place in the finals.  The contestants first emerged on stage in groups of nine or ten but performed solo unaccompanied, and those who did not impress the judges were cut after the group finished their individual performances. The 65 singers who were selected to proceed on to the next round were then separated by gender and given a crash course to learn their next song overnight, which they were expected to perform the next day in small groups.  The girls' song was Dionne Warwick's "I Say a Little Prayer" and the boys' song was Stevie Wonder's "For Once in My Life".  Many, however, frequently forgot the lyrics.  Again, those who failed to impress were cut immediately after their performance. The 20 singers who were cut were given their last chance to voice their opinion to the judges.

In the final round, the remaining 45 were given new songs to learn and each performed solo and a cappella. The Top 15 were first announced, and the judges then selected 15 more out of the remaining 30.  The 30 were split into two groups and the judges then went to each group to announce the chosen group.

Delano Cagnolatti was initially amongst those announced as the Top 30, but he was later disqualified for falsifying his age, and became the first person to be disqualified on American Idol.  He was replaced by EJay Day.

Semi-finals
The 30 contestants who reached this stage in this season were referred to in the show as the finalists.

Before their performance, the contestants took part in intensive music workshop where they were given vocal coaching by Debra Byrd and advice by stylists.  The contestants were held in the Red Room before they each emerged to perform solo with piano accompaniment. There was no studio audience at this stage and the performance was pre-taped.  The audience voted after each round of performance, and the results of the vote were announced the next day live. A total of 3.3 million votes were cast in the first week of voting.
 
Below are the three semi-final groups with contestants listed in their performance order. In each group, three people advanced to the next round, based on votes by the viewers.

Color key:

Group 1

Group 2

Group 3

Wild Card Round
Following those nine singers advancing, five of the remaining 21 semi-finalists were selected by the judges to compete in the Wild Card round. Following another performance by each Wild Card contender, the judges selected one contestant to advance to the final group of 10.

Finals 

The finals were broadcast live, in front of a live studio audience. The finals lasted for eight weeks, each finalist performed a song or songs selected from a weekly theme. During the first few weeks, contestants sang one song each. By the top four week, the contestants sang two songs each, and in the finale the two finalists performed three songs apiece.

The results of public vote were revealed in the night following the performance night in the results show. The three or two contestants in the later rounds who received the lowest number of votes were typically called the Bottom Three or Two. From the bottom three, one contestant was sent to safety so that two contestants remained and finally the contestant who received the fewest votes was eliminated from the competition.  A farewell video with montage of the eliminated contestant is shown.

This season largely set the pattern for later seasons, such as group performance by the contestants during the result shows, hometown visits for the top 3, and performing the songs for the top 2 that would be released immediately after the finale. In this season, there were no guest mentors apart from the Burt Bacharach week where the composer helped the contestants prepare their songs.

The finale was between Kelly Clarkson and Justin Guarini, and Kelly Clarkson was declared the winner with 58% out of 15.5 million votes cast.  Over 110 million votes were cast over the entire season.

A television special from Las Vegas starring the top thirty-two finalists aired later, a thirty date tour with the top ten followed, as did the box office bomb movie titled From Justin to Kelly.

Color key:

Week 1: Top 10 – Motown (July 17)
The first round featured double elimination, which will eliminate the two contestants with the two fewest votes cast from the America's vote.

Week 2: Top 8 – 1960s (July 24)

Week 3: Top 7 – 1970s (July 31)

Week 4: Top 6 – Big Band (August 7)

Week 5: Top 5 – Burt Bacharach Love Songs (August 14)
Burt Bacharach served as the guest mentor this week.

Week 6: Top 4 – 1980/1990s  (August 21)
Each contestant sang two songs.

Week 7: Top 3 – Contestant's choice & Judges' choice (August 28)
Each contestant sang two songs, one chosen by the contestant itself and a second song by the judges.

Week 8: Finale (September 4)
The Top two performed their winner’s song, a reprise of their favorite performance of the season and another original song.

Elimination chart
Color key:

Top 10 Finalists

Kelly Clarkson (born April 24, 1982, in Fort Worth, Texas, 20 years old at the time of the show) is from Burleson, Texas and auditioned in Dallas, Texas with Etta James' "At Last" and Madonna's "Express Yourself."  She performed Aretha Franklin's version of "Respect" and Vanessa Williams' "Save The Best For Last" in the Hollywood rounds.
Justin Guarini (born October 28, 1978, in Columbus, Georgia, 23 years old at the time of the show) is from Doylestown, Pennsylvania and auditioned in New York City with The Jackson 5's version of "Who's Lovin' You." He performed  Oleta Adams' version of "Get Here" in the Hollywood rounds.
Nikki McKibbin (September 28, 1978 - November 1, 2020) in Grand Prairie, Texas, 23 years old at the time of the show) auditioned in Dallas with her married name Nikki Ozment. She had previously been on Popstars and auditioned with Gloria Gaynor's "I Will Survive" and Whitney Houston's "One Moment in Time." She performed The Righteous Brothers' version of "Unchained Melody" in the Hollywood rounds. McKibbin died on November 1, 2020, after suffering an aneurysm, making her the fourth American Idol finalist to die, following Leah LaBelle in 2018, Rickey Smith in 2016, and Michael Johns in 2014.
Tamyra Gray (born July 26, 1979, in Takoma Park, Maryland, 22 years old at the start of the season) is from Atlanta, Georgia and auditioned there with Mariah Carey's "Vision Of Love."  She had appeared on TV commercials and worked with other artists before auditioning for Idol, and was crowned Miss Atlanta in 1998.  She performed Oleta Adams' version of "Get Here" in Hollywood. 
R. J. Helton (born May 17, 1981, in Pasadena, Texas, 21 years old at the time of the show) is from Cumming, Georgia, and auditioned in Atlanta with The Jackson 5's "Never Can Say Goodbye". He had made demo CDs before appearing on American Idol.
Christina Christian (born June 21, 1981, in Brooklyn, New York, 21 years old at the time of the show) and auditioned in Miami, Florida with Stevie Wonder's "Isn't She Lovely?"  She performed Diana Ross' version of "Ain't No Mountain High Enough" in Hollywood
Ryan Starr (born November 21, 1982, in Sunland, California, 18 years old at the time of the show and now runs a popular fashion blog called "sheisryan") she auditioned in Los Angeles.  Her audition song was Bill Withers' "Lean On Me."  She performed Bill Withers' "Ain't No Sunshine" in the Hollywood rounds.
AJ Gil (born July 5, 1984, in San Diego, California, 17 years old at the start of the season; 18 during the remaining episodes) is from Tacoma, Washington and auditioned in Seattle, Washington with "The Star-Spangled Banner".
Jim Verraros (born February 8, 1983, in Chicago, Illinois, 19 years old at the time of the show) is from Crystal Lake, Illinois, and auditioned in Chicago with Nat King Cole's version of "When I Fall In Love." He grew up with Deaf parents and is fluent in ASL (American Sign Language). He performed Diana Ross' "Ain't No Mountain High Enough" in Hollywood.
EJay Day (born September 13, 1981, in Lawrenceville, Georgia, 20 years old at the time of the show) did not originally qualify for the semifinals, but was later chosen to replace disqualified contestant Delano Cagnolatti. He auditioned in Atlanta with Oleta Adams' "Get Here."

Controversy
It was revealed during the season that around 100 phone-phreak hackers with power-dialing hardware and software were able to place as many as 10,000 votes a night from a single phone line with the touch of a button.  However, FremantleMedia, which produces the show, contended that the hackers have had 'statistically insignificant' effect on the vote. Simon Cowell also insisted that Tamyra Gray's unexpected ouster from the show only strengthened the producers' contention that the voting was fair.  Nevertheless, concerns were raised about possible unfairness in the situation of a tight vote.  Ken Warwick later said in Season 5 that equipment was put in place afterwards to address this issue but it allegedly has never detected such a problem since.

Idol contestants were reported to having to sign a 'phone book-thick' contract that gives producers 'sole discretion' to pick the winners and change the rules.

Controversy erupted when the winner of Season 1, Kelly Clarkson, was invited to sing "The Star-Spangled Banner" in a deal arranged by her then management company, 19 Entertainment, at a special commemoration for the first anniversary of September 11 attacks at Washington's Lincoln Memorial. Some critics suggested that Clarkson's appearance would turn a somber occasion of national mourning into a "giant promotional opportunity".  Kelly Clarkson herself considered withdrawing from the commemoration, saying  "I think it is a bad idea ... If anybody thinks I'm trying to market anything, well, that's awful." and added "I am not going to do it."  She was however unable to withdraw from the event.

US Nielsen ratings 
Season one of American Idol was a surprise summer hit show of 2002 and had an average viewership of 12.7 million per episode. It was the summer's highest-rated show in the 18/49 demographic.

American Idol Rewind

Re-edited episodes of American Idol season 1 were being shown in syndication as American Idol Rewind.  The new episodes featured commentary from some of the first season's top 30, including Justin Guarini, Jim Verraros, Christina Christian, Nikki McKibbin, Angela Peel, and Kelli Glover. Rewind also showcased footage that was not seen in the initial run of season 1, including Kelly Clarkson's
full audition.

Releases

Compilations
American Idol: Greatest Moments (Album, 2002)
American Idol: The Great Holiday Classics (Feat. Kelly Clarkson, Justin Guarini, Tamyra Gray, Christina Christian - Album, 2003)
Christmas in a Fishbowl (Feat. Nikki McKibbin, Brad Estrin - Album, 2004)
Voyces United for UNHCR (Feat. Alexandria Bachelier, Brad Estrin – Album, 2006)
American Christmas (Feat. Nikki McKibbin, RJ Helton, Alexis Lopez - Album, 2008)
American Christmas 2 (Feat. Nikki McKibbin, RJ Helton, Alexis Lopez - Album, 2010)

Kelly Clarkson

 "Before Your Love" / "A Moment Like This" (Single, 2002) 
Thankful (Album, 2003)
 "Miss Independent" (Single, 2003)
 "Low" (Single, 2003)
 "The Trouble with Love Is" (Single, 2003)
Breakaway (Album, 2004)
 "Breakaway" (Single, 2004)
 "Since U Been Gone" (Single, 2005)
 "Behind These Hazel Eyes" (Single, 2005)
 "Because of You" (Single, 2005)
 "Walk Away" (Single, 2006)
My December (Album, 2007)
 "Never Again" (Single, 2007)
 "Because of You"  (Single, 2007)
 "Sober" (Single, 2007)
 "One Minute" (Single, 2007)
 "Don't Waste Your Time" (Single, 2007)
All I Ever Wanted (Album, 2009)
 "My Life Would Suck Without You" (Single, 2009)
 "I Do Not Hook Up" (Single, 2009) 
 "Already Gone" (Single, 2009) 
 "All I Ever Wanted" (Single, 2010)
 "Don't You Wanna Stay" (Single, 2010)
Stronger (Album, 2011)
 "Mr. Know It All (Single, 2011)
 "Stronger (What Doesn't Kill You)" (Single, 2012)
 "Dark Side" (Single, 2012)
Greatest Hits: Chapter One (Album, 2012)
 "Catch My Breath" (Single, 2012)
 "Don't Rush" (Single, 2012)
 "People Like Us" (Single, 2013)
"Tie It Up" (Single, 2013)
Wrapped in Red (Album, 2013)
 "Underneath the Tree" (Single, 2013)
 "Wrapped in Red" (Single, 2014)
Piece by Piece (Album, 2015)
"Heartbeat Song" (Single, 2015)
 'Meaning of Life(Album, 2017)
 "Love So Soft" / "Move You" (Single, 2017)
 "Christmas Eve" (Single, 2017)
 "I Don't Think About You" (Single, 2018)
 "Heat" (Single, 2018)
 "Broken & Beautiful" (Single, 2019)
"I Dare You" (Single, 2020)
"Under the Mistletoe" (Single, 2020)
"All I Want for Christmas Is You" (Single, 2020)

Justin GuariniJustin Guarini (Album, 2003)
"Sorry" (Single, 2003)
"Unchained Melody" (Single, 2003)Stranger Things Have Happened (Album, 2005)Revolve (EP, 2008)
"What You Wont Do For Love" (Single, 2016)
"A Change is Gonna Come" (Single, 2019)
"Love Has Found You" (Single, 2019)

Nikki McKibbin
"To Be with You" (Single, 2006)
"The Lie" (Single, 2006)Unleashed (Album, 2007)
"Electrik" (Single, 2007)
"Here to There" (Single, 2008)
"Inconsolable" (Single, 2009)
"Made it" (Single, 2011)
"Celebrity High" (Nikki McKibbin's band Love Stricken Demise – Single, 2011)Psychotrip (Nikki McKibbin's band Love Stricken Demise – EP, 2012)

Tamyra GrayThe Dreamer (Album, 2004)
"Raindrops Will Fall" (Single, 2004)

RJ HeltonReal Life (Album, 2004)
"Even If" (Single, 2004)
"My Devotion" (Single, 2004)
"All We Need to Know" (Single, 2004)
"Why Do We Pray" (Single, 2004)

Ryan Starr
"My Religion" (Single, 2004)
"Blue" (Single, 2008)
"Broken" (Single, 2008)
"Chemically" (Single, 2010)
"Crazy For You" (Single, 2010)

AJ Gil
"Calling All Angels" (Single, 2003)
 "She's Hot" (Single, 2003)
 Love Me Later (Album, 2011)
 Life, Death & Resurrection (Album, 2013)
 "I Live" (Single, 2013)

Jim VerrarosUnsaid and Understood (Album, 2003)Rollercoaster (Album, 2005)
"You Turn It On" (Single, 2005)
"You're Getting Crazy" (Single, 2005)
"You Make it Better" (Single, 2007)
"Electric Love" (Single, 2009)
"Touch (Dont U Want 2?) (Single, 2009)
"Do Not Disturb" (Single, 2009)Do Not Disturb (Album, 2011)

Ejay Day
"Calling All Angels" (Single, 2003)

Other Contestants
"The Edge" (Kristin Adams - Single, 2005) Numb (Angela Peel – Album, 2007)Human Again'' (Adriel Herrera's band Asphalt Apology – Album)

Source:

See also
 American Idols LIVE! Tour 2002

Footnotes

References

External links
 Official American Idol Contestants Website
 

American Idol seasons
2002 American television seasons
2002 in American television
2002 in American music